Niall Carew (born 1974) is an Irish Gaelic football manager and former Gaelic footballer and hurler. He has been manager of the Carlow county team since 2020.

Carew previously managed Waterford and Sligo.

Career
Born in Staplestown, County Kildare, Carew played Gaelic football for the St Kevin's club and hurling for Coill Dubh.

In retirement from playing Carew became involved in team management and coaching. At inter-county level he served as a selector with the senior Kildare county team, before later managing the Waterford and Sligo senior teams. As of 2015, he was managing Ballylinan GAA in south Laois.

In August 2020, Carlow announced him as their successor to Turlough O'Brien.

References

1974 births
Living people
Coill Dubh hurlers
Dual players
Gaelic football managers
Gaelic football selectors
St Kevin's Gaelic footballers